"Big Jock Knew" is a song sung by some supporters of Scottish football club Rangers. It is aimed mainly to antagonise supporters of Rangers' Glasgow rivals Celtic by alleging that former manager Jock Stein was aware of sexual abuse committed by former Celtic Boys Club manager Jim Torbett during the 1960s and 1970s, and did not notify the authorities.

Background
During Torbett's trial in 1998, former Celtic Boys' Club chairman Hugh Birt claimed that Stein and the Celtic board were aware of and covered up allegations made against Torbett. Other witnesses testified that Stein, who by then was deceased, would not have been aware of the matter. At Torbett's second trial Birt stated that Stein had an awareness of the allegations and dismissed Torbett, but the police were not called. In 2017 the Daily Record reported that the BBC "had spoken to three other former Celtic Boys’ Club officials – who were employed at the time in question – who also say they were told Torbett was sacked by Stein after complaints Torbett had abused boys. But police were never called."

Torbett was convicted of abuse against boys in his charge for a second time in 2018, relating to a spell in the 1980s after he returned to Celtic Boys Club. The trial again raised the question of the extent of awareness and involvement of Stein and other Celtic officials into the behaviour of Torbett during his first spell at the organisation, given that he was allowed to hold a position of trust around children for a second time. A BBC Scotland investigation claimed to have other sources supporting Birt's version of events in 1974, whereas Celtic's media releases at the time suggested Torbett had stepped down whilst held in high esteem due to work commitments. The official club statement following the conclusion of the 2018 trial, which expressed 'deep regret' over the abuse, asserted that they only became aware of allegations against Torbett in the mid 1990s.

Reaction 
The song has provoked controversy and been condemned. UNICEF expressed concern over the song and called for it to be banned from football games. The song was not originally placed on a list of banned chants by the Scottish Premier League whereas other similar controversial chants, such as the Billy Boys, were. In 2007, the then Scottish Football Association Chief Executive Gordon Smith called the song "morally repugnant."

There have been several high-profile media mentions of it. In 2007, at the end of the song "Who Knew" by Pink, Real Radio DJ Steven McKenna stated, "Big Jock". This sparked angry complaints from Celtic fans calling for him to be sacked. The radio station then issued a public apology.

See also
United Kingdom football sexual abuse scandal

References 

Rangers F.C. songs
Football songs and chants
Songs about association football players
Songs about sexual assault
Cultural depictions of British men
Cultural depictions of Scottish men
Cultural depictions of association football players
Sexual assault in sports